East Durham College Technical Academy is a construction training college in the North East of England. The College provides training for people who wanted to work in the construction industry, as well as providing additional skills development for people already working in the industry.

Students of all ages can enrol on a range of full-time and part-time courses.

Courses 
The East Durham Technical Academy offer a range of courses in the construction industry. The Technical Academy trains construction workers to the right level of technical ability, so they are able to transfer these skills straight into work. The Academy offers training and courses in:
Electrical Technology
Gas Installation and Maintenance
Renewable Energy
Fitted Interiors
Plastering
Wall & Floor Tiling
Roofing (Tiling & Slating)
Construction Skills.

Partners 
The Technical Academy has partnerships with some of the construction companies in the North East. Through these partnerships the Technical Academy is able to offer real life training meeting the demand in the market. The Technical Academys current partners include:
BAL
British Gypsum
Ceramic Tile Distributors
Durham County Council
East Durham Homes
EDBS
Frank Haslam Milan
Genesis
Harbro
Howdens
Speedfit
Kier
Morrison
RUBI
Tracpipe
Tyco
Wates
Weber

History 
The Rt Hon John Denham MP, Shadow Secretary of State for Business, Innovation and Skills, declared the Academy open following a tour of the  facility in Peterlee, County Durham. The Technical Academy is run and was set up by East Durham College in 2010.

References

External links 
 The Technical Academy website

Further education colleges in County Durham
Construction industry of the United Kingdom
Education in County Durham